

Public General Acts

|-
| {{|Supply and Appropriation (Main Estimates) Act 2022|public|39|14-07-2022|maintained=y|archived=n|An Act to authorise the use of resources for the year ending with 31 March 2023; to authorise both the issue of sums out of the Consolidated Fund and the application of income for that year; and to appropriate the supply authorised for that year by this Act and by the Supply and Appropriation (Anticipation and Adjustments) Act 2022.}}
|-
| {{|Energy (Oil and Gas) Profits Levy Act 2022|public|40|14-07-2022|maintained=y|archived=n|An Act to make provision for, and in connection with, imposing a charge on ring fence profits of companies.}}
|-
| {{|Supply and Appropriation (Adjustments) Act 2022|public|41|25-10-2022|maintained=y|archived=n|An Act to authorise the use of resources for the year ending with 31 March 2023; to authorise the issue of sums out of the Consolidated Fund for that year; and to appropriate the supply authorised by this Act for that year.}}
|-
| {{|Social Security (Special Rules for End of Life) Act 2022|public|42|25-10-2022|maintained=y|archived=n|An Act to provide for certain social security rules which apply where life expectancy is 6 months or less to apply instead where life expectancy is 12 months or less.}}
|-
| {{|Health and Social Care Levy (Repeal) Act 2022|public|43|25-10-2022|maintained=y|archived=n|An Act to make provision for and in connection with the repeal of the Health and Social Care Levy Act 2021.}}
|-
| {{|Energy Prices Act 2022|public|44|25-10-2022|maintained=y|archived=n|An Act to make provision for controlling energy prices; to encourage the efficient use and supply of energy; and for other purposes connected to the energy crisis.}}
|-
| {{|Identity and Language (Northern Ireland) Act 2022|public|45|06-12-2022|maintained=y|archived=n|An Act to make provision about national and cultural identity and language in Northern Ireland.}}
|-
| {{|Product Security and Telecommunications Infrastructure Act 2022|public|46|06-12-2022|maintained=y|archived=n|An Act to make provision about the security of internet-connectable products and products capable of connecting to such products; to make provision about electronic communications infrastructure; and for connected purposes.}}
|-
| {{|Counsellors of State Act 2022|public|47|06-12-2022|maintained=y|archived=n|An Act to add His Royal Highness The Earl of Wessex and Her Royal Highness The Princess Royal to the persons to whom royal functions may be delegated as Counsellors of State.}}
|-
| {{|Northern Ireland (Executive Formation) Act 2022|public|48|06-12-2022|maintained=y|archived=n|An Act to make provision to extend the period following the Northern Ireland Assembly election of 5 May 2022 during which Ministers may be appointed and after which the Secretary of State must propose a date for another election; about the exercise of functions in the absence of Northern Ireland Ministers; to confer powers on the Secretary of State to determine salaries and other benefits for Members of the Assembly in respect of periods in which the Assembly is not functioning; and to confer powers on the Secretary of State to set the regional rate in Northern Ireland.}}
|-
| {{|Finance Act 2023|public|1|10-01-2023|maintained=y|archived=n|An Act to grant certain duties, to alter other duties, and to amend the law relating to the national debt and the public revenue, and to make further provision in connection with finance.}}
|-
| {{|Stamp Duty Land Tax (Temporary Relief) Act 2023|public|2|08-02-2023|maintained=y|archived=n|An Act to reduce, for a temporary period, the amount of stamp duty land tax chargeable on the acquisition of residential property.}}
|-
| {{|Northern Ireland Budget Act 2023|public|3|08-02-2023|maintained=y|archived=n|An Act to authorise the use for the public service of certain resources for the years ending 31 March 2023 and 2024 (including, for the year ending 31 March 2023, income); to authorise the issue out of the Consolidated Fund of Northern Ireland of certain sums for the service of those years; to authorise the use of those sums for specified purposes; to authorise the Department of Finance in Northern Ireland to borrow on the credit of those sums; and to repeal provisions superseded by this Act.}}
|-
| {{|Northern Ireland (Executive Formation and Tissue Donation) Act 2023|public|4|28-02-2023|maintained=y|archived=n|An Act to make provision to extend the period following the Northern Ireland Assembly election of 5 May 2022 during which Ministers may be appointed and after which the Secretary of State must propose a date for another election; to allow the Secretary of State to propose a date for another election before Ministers have been appointed; and to amend the procedure for making regulations defining permitted material for transplantation in Northern Ireland under section 3 of the Human Tissue Act 2004 in the period until the Presiding Officer and deputies of the Assembly are elected.}}
}}

References

Lists of Acts of the Parliament of the United Kingdom